Karaimadai railway station is a station in the Coimbatore suburb of Karamadai, Tamil Nadu, India.

References

Railway stations in Coimbatore